Thomas Leger Hutchinson was the thirty-fifth intendant (mayor) of Charleston, South Carolina. He served twice, defeating John Schnierle in 1846, being defeated by John Schnierle in 1850, and then beating John Schnierle again in 1852.

Hutchinson was first elected intendant on September 7, 1846, succeeding John Schnierle. Hutchinson won successive terms on September 6, 1847; September 4, 1848; and September 3, 1849. In September 1850, however, he lost to John Schnierle. After two years out of the mayorship, Hutchinson was again elected on September 1, 1852, and won a final term the next year on November 2, 1853. He represented the Charleston area (St. Philip's and St. Michael's parishes) in South Carolina General Assembly in the 1862–1863 session.

Hutchinson was born on February 17, 1812. He attended Harvard starting in April 1830 and left in 1832. He died on August 18, 1883, and is buried in French Huguenot churchyard.

References

Mayors of Charleston, South Carolina
Harvard Law School alumni
1812 births
1883 deaths
19th-century American politicians